Balázs Petró (born 1 July 1996) is a Hungarian football player who plays for Dunaújváros.

Club statistics

Updated to games played as of 31 October 2018.

External links

1997 births
People from Miskolc
Living people
Hungarian footballers
Hungary youth international footballers
Association football midfielders
Szombathelyi Haladás footballers
Budaörsi SC footballers
Győri ETO FC players
Diósgyőri VTK players
Szentlőrinci SE footballers
Dunaújváros PASE players
Nemzeti Bajnokság I players
Nemzeti Bajnokság II players